Al-Qaisumah Football Club, is a Saudi Arabian football club based in Qaisumah, Hafar al-Batin, that plays in the Saudi First Division, the second tier of the Saudi Arabian football league system, formed in 1970.

Honours
Saudi Second Division
Winners (1): 2015–16
Saudi Third Division
Winners (1): 2007–08
Runners-up (1): 2014–15

Current squad 

As of Prince Mohammad bin Salman League:

Out on loan

References

Qaisumah
Qaisumah
Qaisumah
Qaisumah